Band Didegan (also Romanized as Bad Dīdegān) is a village in Shahr Meyan Rural District, in the Central District of Eqlid County, Fars Province, Iran. At the 2006 census, its population was 111, in 21 families.

References 

Populated places in Eqlid County